The 1905 South Carolina Gamecocks football team represented the University of South Carolina as an independent during the 1905 college football season. Led by second-year head coach Christie Benet, South Carolina compiled a record of 4–2–1.

Schedule

References

South Carolina
South Carolina Gamecocks football seasons
South Carolina Gamecocks football